Keffing Dioubaté (born 28 November 1975) is a Guinean footballer. He played in five matches for the Guinea national football team in 1998. He was also named in Guinea's squad for the 1998 African Cup of Nations tournament.

References

External links
 

1975 births
Living people
Guinean footballers
Guinea international footballers
1998 African Cup of Nations players
People from Kankan
Association football midfielders
Guinean expatriate footballers
Expatriate footballers in France
Paris Saint-Germain F.C. players
Stade Briochin players
Amiens SC players
Montauban FCTG players
Limoges FC players